Antonio Rodríguez Basulto (born 16 April 1945) is a Spanish politician and former president of La Rioja between January and May 1983.

References

Presidents of La Rioja (Spain)
1945 births
Living people